Narva-Jõesuu (Ust'-Narva, Нарва-Йыэсуу, Усть-Нарова) is a town in Ida-Viru County, in northeastern Estonia.

Geography
It is located on the country's northern Baltic coast of the Gulf of Finland. The town's name in Estonian and Russian means "Mouth of the Narva", the river which forms the border with Russia.

Narva-Jõesuu has a population of 2,602 (as of 1 January 2010).  As in the nearby city of Narva, most residents today are Russian or Russian-speaking, although the percentage of native Estonians is slightly higher in Narva-Jõesuu (13% compared to 4% in Narva).

Narva-Jõesuu marks the northeastern terminus of the E9 European Coastal Path, which runs for 5000 km (3125 miles) from Cabo de São Vicente in Portugal.

Religion

History
The settlement probably arose in the 14th century, then part of the Duchy of Estonia, a dominion of the Livonian Order within Terra Mariana from 1346. It was first documented in a 1503 deed issued by Master of the Order Wolter von Plettenberg and was the site of an outer harbour of the City of Narva from the 16th century, containing several timber stockyards, sawmills, and small shipbuilding industry.

The German name Hungerburg allegedly goes back to the Russian emperor Peter the Great, who noticed the great poverty of the rural population during the 1704 Battle of Narva. The Narva-Jõesuu Lighthouse was erected in 1808.

Tourism

Thanks to its -long white sand beach lined with pine trees – considered one of the finest in Estonia – Narva-Jõesuu has long been a popular summer destination. During the Soviet period, it was visited in large numbers by residents of the renamed Leningrad, particularly the Russian intelligentsia, many of whom have bought dachas (summer houses) in Narva-Jõesuu or on the outskirts.

In the first ten to fifteen years after the restoration of Estonia's independence, Narva-Jõesuu saw few visitors; thus, a large number of hotels and guest houses closed their doors and went out of business. In the last few years, its resort facilities have been renovated, and the number of tourists has been rising. However, the number of hotels is still considerably lower compared to the late 1980s.

Gallery

References

External links

 Narva-Jõesuu Nude Beach

Cities and towns in Estonia
Populated places in Ida-Viru County
Spa towns in Estonia